The 2020–21 Primera División de El Salvador (also known as the Liga Pepsi) is the 22nd season and 43rd and 44th Primera División tournament, El Salvador's top football division, since its establishment of an Apertura and Clausura format. Alianza F.C. and Once Deportivo de Ahuachapan are the defending champions of both Apertura and Clausura tournaments respectively. The league will consist of 12 teams. There will be two seasons conducted under identical rules, with each team playing a home and away game against the other clubs for a total of 22 games per tournament. At the end of each half-season tournament, the top six teams in that tournament's regular season standings will take part in the playoffs.

The champions of Apertura or Clausura with the better aggregate record will qualify for the 2022 CONCACAF Champions League. The other champion, and the runner-up with the better aggregate record will qualify for the 2020 CONCACAF League. Should the same team win both tournaments, both runners-up will qualify for CONCACAF League. Should the final of both tournaments features the same two teams, the semifinalist with the better aggregate record will qualify for CONCACAF League.

Team information 
A total of 12 teams will contest the league, including 10 sides from the 2019–20 Primera División, 1 promoted from the 2019–20 Segunda División and 1 returning from self imposed exile.

No teams were relegated to 2020–21 Segunda División the previous season as that season was cancelled.

Further changes 
 El Vencedor later gave their spot to Atletico Marte.
 Independiente lost their license and their spot was given to Firpo.

Personnel and sponsoring

Notable events

El Vencedor cessation of spot
El Vencedor announced that due to ongoing cost and lack of sponsorship, they would be ceding their spot to Atletico Marte.

Change of ownership
On 3 April, Chalatenango president Rigoberto Mejia announced that Chalatenango had been acquired by a new ownership group

Change of license owner
At the end of the 2020 season, Pablo Herrera (owner of the franchise license) announced that Independiente will lose their license and he will be giving the license to Luis Angel Firpo for the Clausura 2020.

Notable death from Clausura 2020 season and 2021 Apertura season
The following people associated with the Primera Division have died between the middle of 2020 and middle of 2021.

 Miguel Herrera (ex Dragon player)
 Hugo Ernesto Burgos Ventura (ex Chalatenango player) 
 Rodolfo Alvarado Barrientos (Ex Fuerte San Francisco, Cojutepeque and Chalatenango)
 Hugo Ottenson (Chilean, ex Alianza player)
 Marco Pereira (Brazilian, ex Aguila, Metapan, Chalatenango, Luis Angel Firpo, Once Lobos, FAS and Dragon player)
 Jesus Velázquez Chacon (Ex Platense player)
 Peter Sandoval (Guatemalan, ex Once Lobos player)
 Delvani Quaresma (Brazilian, ex Dragon player)
 Ruben Plaino "La Bruja" (Argentinian, ex Firpo player) 
 Mario Tiorra Castro (Ex Sonsonate, Atletico Marte and Aguila)
 Hernan Sosa (Uruguayan, ex Alianza player)
 Juan Carlos Masnik (Uruguayan, ex coach of Atlético Marte, FAS, Firpo and Alianza)
 Agustin Balbueno Mencho (Argentinian, Ex FAS player)
 Mario Carlos Rey (Argentinian, Ex Juventud Olimpica and Alianza player and coach of the latter)
 Daniel Mena Luna (current Firpo player)

Managerial changes

Before the start of the season

During the Apertura season

Between Apertura and Clausura seasons

Clausura seasons

Apertura
Due to the COVID-19 pandemic, teams will divided into groups of three: Orientale Group, Central Group and Occidentale Group.
The first game would start 10 October 2020.

The games will be divided into three different stages:

Phase 1

Group A

Group B

Group C

Phase 2

Group A

Group B

Aggregate Table

Phase 3

Playoffs

Quarterfinals

First legs

Second legs

Aguila won 3-0 on aggregate 

Alianza won 5-2 on Aggregate

Jocoro won 2-1 aggregate

FAS won 3-2 on aggregate

Semifinals

First legs

Second legs

Alianza advances 3-0 on aggregate.

Aguila advances 2-1 on aggregate.

Final

Individual awards

Records 
 Best home records: TBD (0 points out of 33 points)
 Worst home records: TBD (0 points out of 33 points)
 Best away records : TBD (0 points out of 33 points)
 Worst away records : TBD (0 points out of 33 points)
 Most goals scored: Alianza F.C. (32 goals)
 Fewest goals scored: C.D. Luis Angel Firpo (13 goals)
 Fewest goals conceded : C.D. Aguila (14 goals)
 Most goals conceded : Atletico Marte (33 goals)

Scoring 
 First goal of the season:  Roberto Hernandez for Jocoro against Firpo, 78 minutes (10 October 2020)
 First goal by a foreign player:  Nicolas Munoz for Aguila against Limeno, 18 minutes (10 October 2020)
 Fastest goal in a match: 15 Seconds
  Ramon Rodriguez for Limeno against FAS (13 December 2020)
 Goal scored at the latest goal in a match: 90+2 minutes
  Roberto Hernandez  goal for Jocoro against Firpo, (October 10, 2020)
 First penalty Kick of the season:  Nicolas Munoz for Aguila against Limeno, 18 minutes (10 October 2020)
 Widest winning margin: 6 goals
  Isidro Metapan 6-0 Once Deportivo (October 18, 2020)
 First hat-trick of the season: Elvin Alvarado for  Once Deportivo against Sonsonate  (October 11, 2020)
 First own goal of the season:  Alexander Mendoza (Santa Tecla F.C.) for Alianza F.C. (October 11, 2020)
 Most goals in a match: 8 goals
 Atletico Marte 3-5 Alianza F.C. (November 23, 2020)
 Most goals by one team in a match: 6 goals
 Isidro Metapan  6-0 Once Deportivo   (October 18, 2020)
 Most goals in one half by one team: 3 goals
 C.D. Sonsonate 2-3 (2-3) Isidro Metapan (2nd half, December 20, 2020) 
 Most goals scored by losing team: 3 goals
 Atletico Marte 3-5 Alianza F.C. (November 23, 2020)
 Most goals by one player in a single match: 3 goals
 Elvin Alvarado for  Once Deportivo against Sonsonate  (October 11, 2020)
 Players that scored a hat-trick': 
 Elvin Alvarado for  Once Deportivo against Sonsonate  (October 11, 2020)

Clausura

Results

Phase 3 (Playoffs)

Quarterfinals

First legs

Second legs

Firpo won 4-1 on aggregate 

Santa Tecla won 3-2 on aggregate 

Alianza won 3-2 on aggregate 

2-2. FAS won 3-2 on Penaties

Semifinals

First legs

Second legs

2-2. Alianza advances 5-4 on penalties.

1-1. FAS advances 4-2 on penalties.

Final 

{| style="font-size: 90%" cellspacing="0" cellpadding="0" align=center
|colspan="5" style="padding-top: 0.6em; text-align:center"|FAS
|-
!width="25"| !!width="25"|
|-
|GK ||1||  Kevin Carabantes
|-
|DF ||20||  Ibsen Castro ||   
|-
|DF ||23||  Roberto Chen
|-
|DF ||24||  Mauricio Cuellar 
|-
|DF ||6||  Andrés Flores || own goal ||   
|-
|MF ||6||  Ervian Flores ||  
|-
|MF ||11||  Tomas Granitto ||  
|-
|MF ||27||  Carlos Peña  || 
|-
|MF ||21||  Wilma Torres ||  
|-
|MF ||7||  Kevin Reyes ||   ||   
|-
|FW ||9||  Luis Peralta ||  
|-
|colspan=5|Substitutes:
|-
|MF ||4||  Guillermo Stradella || ||     
|-
|FW ||9||  Brayan Landeverde || ||  
|-
|MF ||6||  Dustin Corea || ||  
|-
|MF ||11||  Julio Amaya || ||  
|-
|MF ||'''11||  Luis Perea || ||  
|-
|colspan=5|Manager:|-
|colspan=5| Jorge Humberto Rodriguez
|}

 Records 
 Best home records: TBD (0 points out of 33 points)
 Worst home records: TBD (0 points out of 33 points)
 Best away records : TBD (0 points out of 33 points)
 Worst away records : TBD (0 points out of 33 points)
 Most goals scored: Alianza F.C. (38 goals)
 Fewest goals scored: Jocoro F.C. (9 goals)
 Fewest goals conceded : C.D. Aguila (10 goals)
 Most goals conceded : Atletico Marte (34 goals)

 Scoring 
 First goal of the season:  Ronald Rodriguez for Aguila against Limeno, 24 minutes (14 February 2021)
 First goal by a foreign player:  Ovidio Lanza for Jocoro against Firpo, 46 minutes (14 February 2021)
 Fastest goal in a match: 2 Minutes  Jhon Machado for Isidro Metapan against FAS (February 14, 2021)
 Goal scored at the latest goal in a match: 90 minutes  Diego Sanchez goal for Santa Tecla against Atletico Marte, (February 18, 2021)
 First penalty Kick of the season:  Esquiel Rivas for Chalatenango against Atletico Marte, 27 minutes (14 February 2021)
 Widest winning margin: 5 goals  Firpo 5-0 Atletico Marte (April , 2021)
 First hat-trick of the season:  Kemal Orlando Malcolm for  Chalatenango against Santa Tecla F.C.  (April, 2021)
 First own goal of the season:  Alexander Mendoza (Santa Tecla F.C.) for Atletico Marte, (February 18, 2021)
 Most goals in a match: 8 goals Atletico Marte 3-5 Alianza F.C. (November 23, 2020)
 Most goals by one team in a match: 5 goals  Firpo 5-0 Atletico Marte (April , 2021)
 Most goals in one half by one team: 3 goals C.D. Sonsonate 2-3 (2-3) Isidro Metapan (2nd half, December 20, 2020) 
 Most goals scored by losing team: 3 goals Atletico Marte 3-5 Alianza F.C. (November 23, 2020)
 Most goals by one player in a single match: 3 goals Kemal Orlando Malcolm for  Chalatenango against Santa Tecla F.C.  (April, 2021)
 Players that scored a hat-trick': 
 Kemal Orlando Malcolm for  Chalatenango against Santa Tecla F.C.  (April, 2021)

 List of foreign players in the league 
This is a list of foreign players in the 2020–21 season. The following players:

 Have played at least one game for the respective club.
 Have not been capped for the El Salvador national football team on any level, independently from the birthplace

A new rule was introduced this season, that clubs can have four foreign players per club and can only add a new player if there is an injury or a player is released and it is before the close of the season transfer window. Águila  Bruno Kairon
  Yan Maciel
  Marlon Da Silva de Moura
  Andrés QuejadaAlianza  Maximiliano Freitas 
  Felipe Ponce Ramírez  
  Oswaldo Blanco 
  Mitchel Mercado 
  Jorge CórdobaAtletico Marte  Luis Tatuaca 
  Argenis Alba (*)
  Daniel Guzman 
  Eduardo Rodriguez  
  Jhony Moran Chan (*)
  Sebastian Viafara (*)
  Yoan Ballesteros (*)Chalatenango  Sergio Cordoba 
  Luis Paradela 
  Emerson Lalin 
  Carlos Felix 
  Jesus Everardo Rubio 
  Craig Foster
  Chevone Marsh
  Kemal Orlando MalcolmFAS  Luis Perea
  Raúl Peñaranda 
  Diego Areco 
  Jose Luis Rodriguez 
  Gullit Peña(*)
  Luis Peralta
  Roberto ChenFirpo  Tardelius Pena
  Fredrick Ogangan 
  Armando Polo  
  Nelson Barahona
  Eber CaicedoIsidro Metapán  Guillermo Vernetti (*)
  Ricardinho 
  Jhon Machado
  Yeison Murillo 
  Jomal Williams 
  Leonardo Incoruala (*)Jocoro  Eder Moscoso 
  Junior Jesus Padilla 
  Arnold Josue Melendez  
  Ovidio Lanza
  Beitar Córdoba 
  William GuerreroLimeño  Beitar Córdoba 
  Jeison Quiñonez 
  Samuel Jiménez 
  Hugo Alexis Oviedo Jara
  Robinson Aponzá
  Eisner Loboa
  Yosimar QuinonesOnce Deportivo  Luis Fernando Copete 
  Daley Mena  
  Abdiel Macea  
  Edgar Medrano
  Édgar Solís
  Dieter Vargas
  Marvin PiñónSonsonate  David Boquín 
  Daniel Buitrago 
  Jose Mondragon 
  Víctor Landazuri (*)
  Andres Martin Lima (*)Santa Tecla'  Alejandro Dautt 
  Yosimar Quinones 
  Cristian Olivera (*)
  Eduardo Rodriguez (*)
  Diego Areco

 (player released during the Apertura season) (player released between the Apertura and Clausura seasons) (player released during the Clausura season) (player naturalised for the Clausura season)''

References 

Primera División de Fútbol Profesional seasons
El Salvador
1